Australia's Cheapest Weddings is an Australian reality television series which premiered on the Seven Network on 22 August 2016. The program is narrated by Melanie Vallejo and follows couples who plan their wedding on a very small budget.

After three episodes, following poor ratings, Channel Seven pulled the show from its schedule indefinitely but did not confirm its cancellation. Unaired episodes returned from 10 November 2016.

Ratings

References

Seven Network original programming
Wedding television shows
2010s Australian reality television series
2016 Australian television series debuts